Pterolepis is a genus of bush crickets in the subfamily Tettigoniinae and tribe Platycleidini erected by Jules Pierre Rambur in 1838.  The known distribution is from North Africa and the Iberian peninsula.

Species
The Orthoptera Species File lists the following accepted species:

 Pterolepis adolphorum (Galvagni, 1988)
 Pterolepis algerica (Uvarov, 1935)
 Pterolepis augustini (Galvagni, 2001)
 Pterolepis berberica (Galvagni, 1989)
 Pterolepis bidens (Uvarov, 1924)
 Pterolepis claudiae (Galvagni, 1988)
 Pterolepis cordubensis Bolívar, 1900
 Pterolepis elymica Galvagni & Massa, 1980
 Pterolepis galitana (Uvarov, 1942)
 Pterolepis gessardi Bonnet, 1886
 Pterolepis grallata (Pantel, 1886)
 Pterolepis kabylica (Galvagni & Fontana, 2000)
 Pterolepis korsakovi (Uvarov, 1942)
 Pterolepis lagrecai (Fontana & Massa, 2004)
 Pterolepis lusitanica (Bolívar, 1900)
 Pterolepis maroccana (Bolívar, 1905)
 Pterolepis maura (Bonnet, 1886)
 Pterolepis moralesi (Galvagni, 1988)
 Pterolepis pedata Costa, 1882
 Pterolepis pieltaini (Morales-Agacino, 1940)
 Pterolepis pityusensis Barranco, 2014
 Pterolepis spoliata Rambur, 1838 - type species (P. spoliata spoliata: one of 8 subspecies)
 Pterolepis theryana Uvarov, 1927

References

External links
 
 

Orthoptera of Africa
Orthoptera of Europe
Ensifera genera
Tettigoniinae